Macrodema is a genus of true bugs belonging to the family Rhyparochromidae.

The species of this genus are found in Europe.

Species:
 Macrodema lathroboides Fieber, 1861 
 Macrodema micropterum (Curtis, 1836)

References

Rhyparochromidae